Iceland participated in the Eurovision Song Contest 2007 with the song "Valentine Lost" written by Sveinn Rúnar Sigurðsson and Peter Fenner. The song was performed by Eiríkur Hauksson. Eiríkur Hauksson previously represented Iceland in the Eurovision Song Contest 1986 and Norway in the Eurovision Song Contest 1991, where they placed sixteenth and seventeenth with the songs "Gleðibankinn" (as part of ICY) and "Mrs. Thompson" (as part of Just 4 Fun), respectively. The Icelandic entry for the 2007 contest in Helsinki, Finland was selected through the national final Söngvakeppni Sjónvarpsins 2007, organised by the Icelandic broadcaster Ríkisútvarpið (RÚV). The selection consisted of three semi-finals and a final, held on 20 January, 27 January, 3 February and 17 February 2007, respectively. Eight songs competed in each semi-final with the top three as selected by a public televote advancing to the final. In the final, "Ég les í lófa þínum" performed by Eiríkur Hauksson emerged as the winner exclusively through public televoting. The song was later translated from Icelandic to English for the Eurovision Song Contest and was titled "Valentine Lost".

Iceland competed in the semi-final of the Eurovision Song Contest which took place on 10 May 2007. Performing during the show in position 5, "Valentine Lost" was not announced among the top 10 entries of the semi-final and therefore did not qualify to compete in the final. It was later revealed that Iceland placed thirteenth out of the 28 participating countries in the semi-final with 77 points.

Background 

Prior to the 2007 Contest, Iceland had participated in the Eurovision Song Contest nineteen times since its first entry in 1986. Iceland's best placing in the contest to this point was second, which it achieved in 1999 with the song "All Out of Luck" performed by Selma. Since the introduction of a semi-final to the format of the Eurovision Song Contest in 2004, Iceland has, to this point, yet to qualify to the final. In 2006, Iceland failed to qualify to the final with the song "Congratulations" performed by Silvía Night.

The Icelandic national broadcaster, Ríkisútvarpið (RÚV), broadcasts the event within Iceland and organises the selection process for the nation's entry. RÚV confirmed their intentions to participate at the 2007 Eurovision Song Contest on 21 October 2006. In 2004 and 2005, Iceland opted to internally select their entry for the Eurovision Song Contest. In 2006, a national final was used to select the Icelandic entry, a method that continued for their 2007 participation.

Before Eurovision

Söngvakeppni Sjónvarpsins 2007 
Söngvakeppni Sjónvarpsins 2007 was the national final format developed by RÚV in order to select Iceland's entry for the Eurovision Song Contest 2007. The four shows in the competition were hosted by Ragnhildur Steinunn Jónsdóttir and all took place at the BaseCamp Studio in Reykjavík. The semi-finals and final were broadcast on RÚV and online at the broadcaster's official website ruv.is.

Format 
Twenty-four songs in total competed in Söngvakeppni Sjónvarpsins 2007 where the winner was determined after three semi-finals and a final. Eight songs competed in each semi-final on 20 January, 27 January and 3 February 2007. The top three songs from each semi-final qualified to the final which took place on 3 February 2007. The results of the semi-finals and final were determined by 100% public televoting. All songs were required to be performed in Icelandic during all portions of the competition, however, it will be up to the winning composers to decide the language that will be performed at the Eurovision Song Contest in Helsinki.

Competing entries 
On 21 October 2006, RÚV opened the submission period for interested songwriters to submit their entries until the deadline on 16 November 2006. Songwriters were required to be Icelandic, possess Icelandic citizenship or have permanent residency in Iceland by 1 October 2006, and had the right to submit up to three entries. At the close of the submission deadline, 188 entries were received. A selection committee was formed in order to select the top twenty-four entries. The twenty-four competing artists and songs were revealed by the broadcaster on 15 January 2007. Among the competing artists were previous Icelandic Eurovision entrants Eiríkur Hauksson, who represented Iceland and Norway in 1986 and 1991 as part of ICY and Just 4 Fun, respectively, and Jónsi, who represented Iceland in 2004. Matthías Matthíasson was initially announced as the performer of the song "Eldur", however, RÚV announced on the same day that his song would be performed by Friðrik Ómar Hjörleifsson instead.

Shows

Semi-finals 
The three semi-finals took place on 20 January, 27 January and 3 February 2007. In each semi-final eight acts presented their entries, and the top two entries voted upon solely by public televoting proceeded to the final.

Final 
The final took place on 17 February 2007 where the nine entries that qualified from the preceding three semi-finals competed. The winner, "Ég les í lófa þínum" performed Eiríkur Hauksson, was determined solely by televoting. In addition to the performances of the competing artists, the interval act featured guest performances by Mihai Trăistariu, who represented Romania at the 2006 Eurovision Song Contest with the song "Tornerò".

Preparation 
On 12 March 2007, it was announced that "Ég les í lófa þínum" would be performed in English at the Eurovision Song Contest and would be titled "Valentine Lost" with lyrics by Peter Fenner. The official music video for the song was released on 15 March 2007.

At Eurovision

According to Eurovision rules, all nations with the exceptions of the host country, the "Big Four" (France, Germany, Spain and the United Kingdom) and the ten highest placed finishers in the 2006 contest are required to qualify from the semi-final on 10 May 2007 in order to compete for the final on 12 May 2007. On 12 March 2007, a special allocation draw was held which determined the running order for the semi-final. Iceland was drawn to perform in position 5, following the entry from Belarus and before the entry from Georgia.

The semi-final and the final were broadcast in Iceland on RÚV with commentary by Sigmar Guðmundsson. The Icelandic spokesperson, who announced the Icelandic votes during the final, was Ragnhildur Steinunn Jónsdóttir.

Semi-final 
Eiríkur Hauksson took part in technical rehearsals on 5 and 6 May, followed by dress rehearsals on 9 and 10 May. The Icelandic performance featured Eiríkur Hauksson dressed in a black outfit and performing in a band set-up. The LED screens transitioned from white spots pointing downwards to interwoven Celtic chain symbol in blue and white colours. The musicians that joined Eiríkur Hauksson were members of the Svenster Bling Band: Axel Þórir Þórissson, Benedikt Brynleifsson, Gunnar Þór Jónsson, Sigurbjörn Þór Þórsson and Stefán Steindórsson.

At the end of the show, Iceland was not announced among the top 10 entries in the semi-final and therefore failed to qualify to compete in the final. It was later revealed that Iceland placed thirteenth in the semi-final, receiving a total of 77 points.

Voting 
Below is a breakdown of points awarded to Iceland and awarded by Iceland in the semi-final and grand final of the contest. The nation awarded its 12 points to Hungary in the semi-final and to Finland in the final of the contest.

Points awarded to Iceland

Points awarded by Iceland

References

2007
Countries in the Eurovision Song Contest 2007
Eurovision